Armoured reconnaissance is the combination of terrestrial reconnaissance with armoured warfare by soldiers using tanks and wheeled or tracked armoured reconnaissance vehicles. While the mission of reconnaissance is to gather intelligence about the enemy with the use of reconnaissance vehicles, armoured reconnaissance adds the ability to fight for information, and to have an effect on and to shape the enemy through the performance of traditional armoured tasks.

Whereas ordinary scouts are expected to either infiltrate the enemy lines by avoiding contact, or to retreat in the face of anything more than enemy scouting parties, an armoured reconnaissance team is expected to be able to break through enemy lines by overwhelming forward screening elements. Armoured reconnaissance units are expected to put enemy scouting units to flight, force screens to retreat, work to disrupt both logistics and communication lines, and force their way deep enough behind enemy lines to reconnoiter the main enemy force deployments and encampments. Armoured reconnaissance vehicles and tactics are capable of fending off any light advance unit the enemy can field, and is theoretically on equal terms with the armoured main elements of the enemy force.

Armoured reconnaissance units by country

Australia
In the Australian Army the main reconnaissance vehicle is the ASLAV armoured scout car, which is the Australian version of the LAV 25.  The Army Reserve regiments use the Light Cavalry Patrol Vehicle, aka the Regional Force Surveillance Vehicle, which is a variant of the Land Rover Perentie.

Armoured reconnaissance/cavalry regiments in the Australian Army

Regular
 1st Armoured Regiment
 2nd Cavalry Regiment
 2nd/14th Light Horse Regiment (Queensland Mounted Infantry)

Reserve
 1st/15th Royal New South Wales Lancers
 3rd/9th Light Horse (South Australian Mounted Rifles)
 4th/19th Prince of Wales's Light Horse
 10th Light Horse Regiment

Belgium
The Belgian Army has two armoured reconnaissance regiments
1st Regiment Mounted Rifles – Guides
2nd/4th Regiment Mounted Rifles

Canada

In the Canadian Army, formation reconnaissance is normally primarily conducted by divisional armoured regiments that gather and fight for information, as well as performing more traditional armour tasks such as seizing, penetrating, and exploiting. There has not been a divisional armoured reconnaissance regiment in Canada since 1992. While there are no armoured reconnaissance regiments in the Regular Force in the present day, each Regular Force armoured regiment does provide a formation armoured reconnaissance squadron equipped with armoured cars to each mechanised brigade. Lord Strathcona's Horse (Royal Canadians) is a tank-heavy regiment with two squadrons of tanks and one squadron of armoured cars, while both the Royal Canadian Dragoons and the 12e Régiment blindé du Canada are armoured car-heavy regiments, with three armoured car squadrons each and one shared tank squadron.

Although the Reserve Force regiments continue to be known as armoured reconnaissance regiments, since the loss of the medium tank from their organisation, they have in reality only been employed in the light reconnaissance (scout) role.

Armoured reconnaissance regiments in the Reserve Force.

The Governor General's Horse Guards
The Halifax Rifles (RCAC)
8th Canadian Hussars (Princess Louise's)
The Ontario Regiment (RCAC)
The Queen's York Rangers (1st American Regiment) (RCAC)
Sherbrooke Hussars
12e Régiment blindé du Canada (Milice)
1st Hussars
The Prince Edward Island Regiment (RCAC)
The Royal Canadian Hussars (Montreal)
The British Columbia Regiment (Duke of Connaught's Own)
The South Alberta Light Horse
The Saskatchewan Dragoons
The King's Own Calgary Regiment (RCAC)
The British Columbia Dragoons
The Fort Garry Horse
Le Régiment de Hull (RCAC)
The Windsor Regiment (RCAC)

Denmark
There is only one armoured reconnaissance battalion in the Danish army.
 3rd Battalion, (III/GHR) Guard Hussar Regiment (Gardehusarregimentet)

The following Danish reconnaissance units were disbanded after the Cold War:
 5th Battalion, (V/JDR) disband in 2005 (Jutlands Dragoons) Jydske Dragonregiment
 Recce-Squadron (six M/41DK1 Walker-bulldog), disband in 2000 (Bornholm Guards) Bornholms Værn. On the island of Bornholm

Germany
In 2005 the reconnaissance units of the German Army were restructured. The former Panzeraufklärungstruppe ("armoured reconnaissance corps"), Fernspähtruppe  ("long range reconnaissance corps"), Feldnachrichtentruppe and UAV units of the Artillerietruppe ("artillery corps") haven been combined to the new Heeresaufklärungstruppe ("army reconnaissance corps").

Now the German Army is operating five reconnaissance battalions and five independent companies:
 Armoured Reconnaissance
 Aufklärungslehrkompanie 90, Munster
 Aufklärungskompanie 210, Augustdorf
 Long Range Reconnaissance
 Fernspählehrkompanie 200, Pfullendorf
 Airborne Reconnaissance
 Luftlandeaufklärungskompanie 260, Zweibrücken
 Luftlandeaufklärungskompanie 310, Seedorf

Reconnaissance Bataillons:
 Aufklärungslehrbataillon 3, Lüneburg
 Aufklärungsbataillon 6, Eutin
 Aufklärungsbataillon 8, Freyung
 Aufklärungsbataillon 13, Gotha
 Gebirgsaufklärungsbataillon 230, Füssen

Reserve units:
 Aufklärungsbataillon 910, Gotha
 Aufklärungsbataillon 911, Füssen
 Aufklärungsbataillon 912, Lüneburg

Every battalion (except the Aufklärungslehrbataillon 3) is structured in four companies:
1. HQ & Support Company
 The first company provides the battalion with communication, maintenance and transport.
2. Armoured Reconnaissance Company
 The armoured reconnaissance company operates all the Fennek vehicles of the battalion. They are organized in six platoons each of four vehicles. Two Fennek form a "scout squad" (Spähtrupp).
3. Light Reconnaissance Company
 The light reconnaissance company includes three HUMINT platoons (Feldnachrichtenzüge) and one scout platoon equipped with six Dingo.
4. UAV Company
 The fourth company operates the two UAV platoons with LunaX and KZO. There is also a radar platoon, equipped with eight Dingo and the  BÜR radar system

Ghana
Ghana's Armoured Reconnaissance Regiment is the oldest armoured unit in the Ghanaian Army. It was formed at the country's independence in 1957 and consists of two squadrons. The regiment has served with distinction in various African peacekeeping missions, and is partly equipped with EE-9 Cascavel and Ratel-90 armoured cars.

1st Ghanaian Armoured Reconnaissance Regiment

Kenya
The Kenyan Army has a single armoured reconnaissance battalion, equipped mainly with Panhard AML-90 armoured cars.

76 ARB (armoured reconnaissance battalion)

Netherlands
The Dutch Army has one regiment, the Regiment Huzaren van Boreel which was named after Willem Francois Boreel. The Regiment consists of four squadrons: two squadrons belong to the ISTAR battalion and the other two each belong to one of the two Netherlands Mechanised Brigades. The difference in organisation between the ISTAR squadrons and the brigade squadrons is that the ISTAR squadrons each have a Tactical Air Control Party for Close Air Support and the two brigade squadrons each have an FST section. All squadrons are trained to operate completely independently. They have their own logistical support and all patrols have communication specialists and special forces medics for emergencies. The training and operation procedures of all squadrons are very similar although the ISTAR squadrons focus more on missions not from brigade but from national command. All squadrons have been on combat operations in the south of Afghanistan.

New Zealand
The New Zealand Army only has one squadron that performs armoured reconnaissance. This is also the only reserve armoured squadron.

Queen Alexandra's Mounted Rifles
4th Waikato Mounted Rifles part of 6th Hauraki Battalion Group

Norway
The Norwegian Army has two armoured reconnaissance squadrons.
Tropp 2/ Pansret Oppklarning part of the Cavalry Squadron in the Telemark Battalion
Tropp 2/ Pansert Oppklarning part of the Cavalry Squadron in the Panser Battalion

Sri Lanka
The Sri Lanka Army has five recce regiments attached to the Sri Lanka Armoured Corps.
1st Reconnaissance Regiment SLAC
3rd Reconnaissance Regiment SLAC
5th Reconnaissance Regiment SLAC
6th Reconnaissance Regiment SLAC
8th Reconnaissance Regiment SLAC

South Africa

There is only one dedicated armoured reconnaissance regiment in the South African Army, the Light Horse Regiment, and it is considered an armoured car unit. The regiment, which has its roots in the British South African Light Horse, was initially equipped with Ferret scout cars. Following the aggressive nature of South African reconnaissance doctrine, the lightly armed Ferret was replaced first by the Eland Mk7 and after 1991 the Rooikat, which were heavier vehicles equipped with large-calibre cannon.

 Light Horse Regiment

United Kingdom
In the British Army armoured reconnaissance units carry out "formation reconnaissance" for higher level formations. In the British Army these Formation reconnaissance regiments are usually providing reconnaissance for a division or a heavy brigade. In a large-scale defensive operation, they would delay attacking forces, whilst screening heavier units as they moved to engage the enemy. The regiments are, currently, almost entirely equipped with vehicles of the Combat Vehicle Reconnaissance (Tracked) – CVR(T) – family.  Some of the armoured regiments of the British Army are known as formation reconnaissance instead of armoured.

Formation reconnaissance regiments in the British Army

Household Cavalry Regiment
The Life Guards
The Blues and Royals (Royal Horse Guards and 1st Dragoons)
Royal Armoured Corps
1st The Queen's Dragoon Guards
Royal Lancers (Queen Elizabeths' Own)
The Light Dragoons
Army Reserve (formerly Territorial Army)
The Royal Yeomanry
The Queen's Own Yeomanry
Scottish and North Irish Yeomanry

United States
 Army

Each brigade combat team  (BCT) (there are multiple combat support and combat service support brigades that may or may not have such assets) in the Army has an organic reconnaissance squadron assigned to it. Each heavy brigade combat team has an armoured reconnaissance squadron consisting of three reconnaissance troops and an unmanned aerial vehicle troop.  The reconnaissance troops have two reconnaissance  platoons with five M1114 HMMWVs and three M3 Cavalry Fighting Vehicles (a variant of the M2 Bradley Fighting Vehicle). Stryker BCTs include a Stryker-vehicle-based reconnaissance squadron. There are more than 30 cavalry reconnaissance squadrons in the US Army.

Incomplete list:
 US cavalry regiments Cavalry (United States)
 Cavalry scout – US Army specialist position

 Marine Corps

The United States Marine Corps light armored reconnaissance  (LAR) battalions use the LAV-25, an 8×8 wheeled amphibious vehicle.

Regular
 1st Light Armored Reconnaissance Battalion – 1st Marine Division
 2nd Light Armored Reconnaissance Battalion – 2nd Marine Division
 3rd Light Armored Reconnaissance Battalion – 1st Marine Division

Reserve
 4th Light Armored Reconnaissance Battalion – 4th Marine Division (reservist)

Notes and references

Combat occupations
Military intelligence collection
Maneuver tactics
Reconnaissance